Hayling United Football Club is a football club based on Hayling Island in Hampshire, England. The club is affiliated to the Hampshire Football Association, and is a FA Charter Standard club. The Humbugs were founded in 1884 as Hayling Island, but changed their name in the early seventies to the present name.

History

Formation and early years

There is no definitive date for the founding of the club but there are numerous mentions of matches being played in 1884 including one against a team that went on to become Portsmouth Football Club. 

Playing in the Portsmouth side that day under the name of A C Smith was a struggling local doctor who went on to become the creator of Sherlock Holmes as Arthur Conan Doyle.

Teams under the name of Hayling Island continued to play in the Waterlooville and District League until the club joined the Portsmouth League in the early fifties. 

From there some 40 years later they progressed to the Hampshire League where their first fixture was in the north Hampshire (nearly Berkshire) village of Ecchinswell, the home of Sir Andrew Lloyd Webber who, it was suggested at the time, was sponsoring the club. By this time the club were playing as Hayling United having changed their name in the early 1970s.

Wessex League success

In 2004 Hayling joined the newly-formed Wessex League Division Three. After finishing runners-up in back-to-back seasons, they achieved promotion to Division One. Hayling lost just five games in their debut season at this level, scoring a club record 116 goals in the process, and were crowned champions of the division.

A six-season stint in the Wessex Premier League followed, where Hayling achieved their highest-ever finish in the 2008 season and also took part in the early rounds of the FA Cup.

Defeats to Romsey and Blackfield & Langley in 2009 and 2010 respectively brought a premature end to Hayling's FA Cup dreams, but they would have more joy the following season. After holding Bridport to a 2-2 draw at St Mary's Field, Hayling's hopes of progression were wiped out thanks to a 2-0 home defeat in the replay. 

The Humbugs fared better in the FA Vase, especially during the 2012-13 season. Having successfully navigated a tough first-qualifying round replay against Verwood Town, Hayling then beat local rivals AFC Portchester in the following stage to set up a first-round proper clash away to Cadbury Heath. The Humbugs struck twice in south Gloucestershire but lost 3-2, bringing a bitter end to an encouraging cup run.

Back-to-back relegations

Throughout the 2012-13 Wessex Premier Division campaign, Hayling United were issued warnings over the state of their ground by the league. The authority's argument was that the College Ground did not meet the Grade F grade required for the Wessex Premier league as the ground was not fully enclosed by a six-foot-high perimeter fence. However, due to the fact that the Humbugs only rented the field from the Hayling College, installing the fence was harder than it first appeared.

After several negotiations, it was decided that a removable fence would be placed at one of the field's entrances, and would be installed on match days by club representatives. Despite finding a temporary solution, Hayling were still demoted to the Wessex Division One at the end of the 2012-13 season and a points deduction ensured they would be relegated to the Hampshire Division One ahead of the 2014-15 campaign.

On the rise again

After steadying the ship with a respectable seventh-placed finish, Hayling achieved promotion back to the Hampshire Premier League by finishing runners-up in 2015-16.

Notable former players

Hayling’s most famous ‘son’ is former Chelsea player Bobby Tambling, recently overtaken by Frank Lampard as the Blues’ all-time record goalscorer. He played for Hayling in his youth days and managed the club for a spell in the 1990s, before turning out a couple of times in the No 11 shirt despite being in his fifties.

Performance by season

Honours

League competitions

Wessex League Division One
 Champions (1) 2006-07

Wessex League Division Two
 Runners-up (1) 2005-06

Wessex League Division Three
 Runners-up (1) 2004-05

Hampshire Premier League
 Runners-up (1) 2015-16

Hampshire League Division One
 Champions (1) 2002-03

Hampshire Combination League
 9th Place (1) 2017-18

Hampshire Senior Cup
 Winners (1) 2017-18

References

External links
Official website

Football clubs in Hampshire
Association football clubs established in 1884
Football clubs in England
1884 establishments in England
Hayling Island
Hampshire Premier League